"Pledge" is a maxi-single featuring a winter ballad by the Japanese rock band the Gazette. It was released on December 15, 2010 in two editions; the "Optical Impression" edition, "Auditory Impression" edition. The first edition has two types, A and B. Type A includes two songs "Pledge" and "The True Murderous Intent", and a DVD containing the music video and making for the song "Pledge". Type B also includes two songs, and a DVD which contains three songs of their latest concert. The second edition comes with a bonus track "Voiceless Fear. This is winter ballad song".

Track listing

Pledge: Optical Impression A 
Disc one
 "Pledge" - 6:04
 "The True Murderous Intent" - 3:22
Disc two (DVD)
 "Pledge: Music Clip + Making"

Pledge: Optical Impression B 
Disc one
 "Pledge" - 6:04
 "The True Murderous Intent" - 3:22
Disc two - Tour10 Nameless Liberty Six Bullets-01- 2010.7.22 at Nippon Budokan (日本武道館) (3 songs)" (DVD)
 "Shiver"
 "Discharge"
 "Swallowtail on the Death Valley"

Pledge: Auditory Impression
 "Pledge" - 6:04
 "The True Murderous Intent" - 3:22
 "Voiceless Fear" - 5:16

Notes
 The PV to "Pledge" was released a few weeks before its initial release.
 The single reached a peak mark of #2 on the Japanese Oricon Weekly Charts.

References

2010 singles
The Gazette (band) songs
2010 songs
Song articles with missing songwriters